Glena plumosaria, the dainty gray moth or plumose gray moth, is a species of moth in the  family Geometridae. It is found in North America, where it has been recorded from Alabama, Florida, Georgia, Indiana, Iowa, Kentucky, Maryland, New Jersey, North Carolina, Ohio, South Carolina, Tennessee and Virginia.

The length of the forewings is 13–14 mm for males and about 16 mm for females. The ground colour is light grey, heavily overlain with greyish brown and brown scales. The hindwings are concolorous with the forewings. Adults are on wing from March to October.

References

Moths described in 1874
Boarmiini